The Royal Fowey Yacht Club is located in a waterfront setting at Fowey, on the south coast of Cornwall one of the UK's most secure harbours.

Its antecedents can be traced back to 1880; its third Honorary Secretary, from 1893, was Arthur Quiller-Couch, who became Sir Arthur. The minutes and descriptions of Yacht races, up to 1897 are in his handwriting. Sir Arthur Quiller-Couch filled the post of Commodore from 1911 until 1944 when he was succeeded by Lt. General Sir Frederick Browning, who upon retirement in 1962, was elected the Club's first Admiral. The Queen and the Duke of Edinburgh were his personal friends, and visited the Club from the RY Britannia, visiting also  him and his wife, the author Daphne du Maurier, at their home at Menabilly, (which became "Manadalay" in her book, "Rebecca").

In 1905 permission was granted for the Club to include in its insignia the Coronet of the Duke of Cornwall over the Shield of the Duchy of Cornwall and in 1907 the King approved the use of the prefix "Royal" in the name of the Club.

External links 
Royal Fowey Yacht Club

References

A Fowey Jigsaw: The History of the Royal Fowey Yacht Club by Joan Rosemary Coombs RFYC Books (Nov 1 2000) 

Royal yacht clubs
Sports clubs in Cornwall
Yacht clubs in England
Organisations based in Cornwall with royal patronage
Organisations based in the United Kingdom with royal patronage
1880 establishments in England
Fowey